Haplocampa is a genus of two-pronged bristletails in the family Campodeidae. There are at least four described species in Haplocampa.

Species
 Haplocampa chapmani Silvestri, 1933
 Haplocampa drakei Silvestri, 1933
 Haplocampa rugglesi Silvestri, 1933
 Haplocampa wagnelli Sendra, 2019
 Haplocampa wheeleri Silvestri, 1912

References

Diplura